
Year 362 BC was a year of the pre-Julian Roman calendar. At the time, it was known as the Year of the Consulship of Ahala and Aventinensis (or, less frequently, year 392 Ab urbe condita). The denomination 362 BC for this year has been used since the early medieval period, when the Anno Domini calendar era became the prevalent method in Europe for naming years.

Events 
 By place 
 Persian Empire 
 Mausolus of Caria joins the revolt of the satraps of Anatolia against the Persian king Artaxerxes II.

 Egypt 
 King Agesilaus II of Sparta arrives with 1,000 men to assist Egypt in its fight with Persia.

 Greece 
 The outbreak of civil war in the Arcadian league leads to Mantinea fighting alongside Sparta and Athens, while Tegea and others members of the league side with Thebes. The Theban general, Epaminondas, heads the large allied army in the Peloponnesus. He is met by Sparta (led by Spartan general Archidamus III), Athens, and their allies in the Battle of Mantinea. In the battle, Epaminondas is victorious, but is killed. His dying command to make peace with the enemy is followed by all sides and a general peace is established in Greece. The period of Theban domination of Greece comes to an end.

 China 
 The states of Qin, Han and Zhao defeat the state of Wei and Qin captures the prince of Wei. The Battle of Shaoliang is then fought between Qin and Wei, which Wei loses, whereupon Qin captures the prime minister of Wei.

Births 
 Eumenes of Cardia, Greek general and scholar (d. 316 BC)

Deaths 
 Epaminondas of Thebes, Greek general and statesman (b. c. 418 BC)
 Duke Xian of Qin, ruler of the Zhou Dynasty state of Qin
 Datames, satrap of Cappadocia and military leader

References